Panasonic Lumix DMC-FZ48 is a digital camera by Panasonic Lumix. The highest-resolution pictures it records is 12.1 megapixels, through its 25mm Leica DC VARIO-ELMARIT.

Property
24x optical zoom and 32x intelligent zoom
2.8 LEICA DC VARIO-ELMARIT lens with Nano Surface Coating technology
Full HD movie
Active POWER O.I.S. mode
Photo 3D

References

External links
DMC-FZ48 on panasonic.it
Panasonic Lumix DMC-FZ48 review

Bridge digital cameras
FZ48